This is a list of Norwegian television related events from 2014.

Events
23 May - 8-year-old jazz singer Angelina Jordan Astar wins the sixth series of Norske Talenter.
8 November - The BlackSheeps singer Agnete Kristin Johnsen and her partner Egor Filipenko win the tenth series of Skal vi danse?.
11 December - Anders Olsson from Sweden wins series 3 of the Scandinavian version of Big Brother, becoming the show's first male winner.
12 December - Ingvar Olsen the eighth series of Idol.

Debuts
31 August - The Scandinavian version of Big Brother (2005-2006, 2014–present)

Television shows

2000s
Idol (2003-2007, 2011–present)
Skal vi danse? (2006–present)
Norske Talenter (2008–present)

2010s
The Voice – Norges beste stemme (2012–present)

Ending this year

Births

Deaths

See also
2014 in Norway